Abena Malika is an actress, singer and DJ from Toronto. She performed in the United States premiere of Da Kink in My Hair by Trey Anthony at the San Diego Repertory Theatre (in 2005). In 2009, she was nominated for the "Dora Mavor Moore Award for Outstanding Performance by a Female in a Principal Role – Play" for her performance in A Raisin in the Sun. She also performed in episodes of the TV series Lost Girl (in 2010), Suits (in 2012), and Rookie Blue (in 2014).

References

External links
 Abena Malika on Twitter
 Abena Malika on Facebook

Living people
Actresses from Toronto
Canadian DJs
Canadian women singers
Canadian Film Centre alumni
Canadian stage actresses
Canadian television actresses
Black Canadian actresses
Musicians from Toronto
Year of birth missing (living people)